Trouble over Bridgwater is the eighth album by UK rock band Half Man Half Biscuit, released in 2000. The title is a play on words, based on the Simon and Garfunkel classic, "Bridge over Troubled Water". Bridgwater is a town in Somerset, England; but, the similarly named Bridgewater Canal runs nearby the band's home of the Wirral.

Track listing
"Irk the Purists"
"Uffington Wassail"
"Third Track Main Camera Four Minutes"
"Nove on the Sly"
"Ballad of Climie Fisher"
"Gubba Look-a-Likes"
"Mathematically Safe"
"With Goth on Our Side"
"Used to Be in Evil Gazebo"
"Slight Reprise"
"It's Clichéd to Be Cynical at Christmas"
"Visitor for Mr Edmonds"
"Bottleneck at Capel Curig"
"Emerging from Gorse"
"Look Dad No Tunes"
"Twenty Four Hour Garage People"

Cultural references
Half Man Half Biscuit often make sly or direct references to celebrities, TV programmes, sportspeople, and to other tunes, lyrics and even literary classics. On this album, those identified include:

 The CD inlay reproduces the title page of Old English Songs by the folk song collector John Broadwood (17981864)
"Irk the Purists" interpolates the hymn Oil in My Lamp and the Black Lace song Agadoo, and references many credible bands and pop artists
 "Third Track Main Camera Four Minutes" quotes from Thomas Hardy's The Return of the Native
 "Gubba Lookalikes" is a reference to Tony Gubba (1943–2013), a British sports commentator, best known for his football commentaries on BBC's Match of the Day in the 1980s and 1990s.
 "With Goth on Our Side" references the Bob Dylan song "With God on Our Side".
 "Used to Be in Evil Gazebo" references Nick Drake, and a non-credible band
"Slight Reprise" is a pun on The Bluetones' "Slight Return "  
 The title "Twenty Four Hour Garage People" is a pun on Happy Mondays' "24 Hour Party People". The middle section of the song parodies "Rock Island Line"; and the conclusion, Lead Belly's version of "In the Pines"

References

External links 
 The longest-established Half Man Half Biscuit fan site
 The Half Man Half Biscuit Lyrics Project

2000 albums
Half Man Half Biscuit albums